Henry Koon House is a historic home located at Troy in Rensselaer County, New York.  It was built about 1830 and is an elegant Greek Revival–style residence.  It is a 2-story, three-by-five-bay, side-hall-plan brick dwelling.  It features a monumental portico composed of four Ionic order columns supporting a full entablature and pediment.

It was listed on the National Register of Historic Places in 1997.

References

Houses on the National Register of Historic Places in New York (state)
Greek Revival houses in New York (state)
Houses in Troy, New York
National Register of Historic Places in Troy, New York